Ghorashal is a town council in the Palash Upazila in the Narsingdi District in central Bangladesh. According to the 2011 Bangladesh census, its population stood at 748, consisting of 203 households. This municipality is the home to the largest power plant in Bangladesh, which began operation in 1974.

Location and boundaries

History and naming

During the reign of Emperor Aurangzeb of Delhi, a powerful and wise man named Sheikh Ghulam Mohammad lived in Tekpara of this area.  His name was also well known in the royal court of Delhi.  Sheikh Ghulam Mohammad was a powerful and wise man of that time.  In his prudence, the Delhi court settled a serious allegation against zamindar Sharif Khan.  Emperor Aurangzeb was pleased with the intelligence of Sheikh Ghulam Mohammad.
As a reward, Sheikh Ghulam Mohammad was given a handsome horse.  Gave another shawl as a gift.  Horses and shawls are the names given to this area.

The main fact

It is known from the description of history, about three hundred and fifty years ago.  At that time Sharif Khan, a descendant of Isha Khan, was the zamindar of Sharifpur.  Although Sharif Khan was a zamindar, he was an independent king.  The Mughal emperor had no right to interfere in the internal affairs of the zamindari without paying taxes.  Zamindar Sharif Khan, son of Sharif Khan's tenant Mohammad Rafi, filed a serious complaint against him at the Delhi royal court.  The trial of this allegation led to an extreme dispute between Zamindar Sharif Khan and the Delhi royal court.  In a written decree of the emperor of Delhi, Sheikh Ghulam Mohammad settled the dispute and made a treaty of Sharif Khan with the emperor of Delhi.  Both Emperor Aurangzeb and Zamindar Sharif Khan were very pleased with the diligence and prudence of Sheikh Ghulam Mohammad.  Then, as a reward for this work, Emperor Aurangzeb presented a horse and a valuable shawl to Sheikh Ghulam Mohammad.  Zamindar Sharif Khan and his adopted daughter Chand Bibi married Sheikh Golam Nabi, the second son of Sheikh Golam Mohammad, and gave him small villages called Charpara, Tekpara, Tengarpara, Binati, Kartail, Rajab and Chamrab as gifts.

History of naming "Ghorashal"

People started coming to the house of Sheikh Ghulam Mohammad in groups to see the horses and shawls given by Emperor Aurangzeb.  "Where are you going?"  When asked, they said "Going see the horse and the shawl."  From then on, Sheikh Ghulam Mohammad's village and this area became known as Ghorashal.

Ghorashal Municipality was established on 20 October 1997.

Population and size
The municipality consists of 9 wards and covers an area of 26.5 km2. 112k people live here.  The total number of voters is 56,300.  Ghorashal on the east bank of the Shitalakshya river is known as an industrial area.

Public representative
The present mayor- Al Mujahid Hossain (Tusher)

List of Mayors
 Md. Elias Mridha (2)
 Md. Shariful Haque (3)
 Al Mujahid Hossain (Tusher)

Notable personalities 
 Kamrul Asraf Khan (Poton)
 Khairul Kabir Khokon
 Ahmedul Kabir

References

Populated places in Narsingdi District
Municipalities in Dhaka Division
Palash Upazila